The Pomeroy Inn & Suites Prairie Showdown was an annual bonspiel, or curling tournament, that took place at the Grande Prairie Curling Club in Grande Prairie, Alberta. The bonspiel was played in a triple knockout format. The bonspiel was started in 2012 as part of the World Curling Tour.

The event was created in order to address the relative lack of events in the World Curling Tour in the weeks leading up to the Players' Championship. Teams are invited to participate in the bonspiel based on certain qualifications. On both the men's and women's sides, teams were chosen from the Peace Region, the rest of Alberta, from a sponsor's exemption, and from the World Curling Tour's Order of Merit.

The event was last held in 2015 and the city's stop on the World Curling Tour was replaced by the smaller Grande Prairie Cash Spiel.

Past champions

Men

Women

References

External links

Grande Prairie Curling Club Home

Former World Curling Tour events
Women's World Curling Tour events
Sport in Grande Prairie
Curling in Alberta